"Steam" is a song by English rock musician Peter Gabriel, released in January 1993 as the second single from his sixth album, Us (1992). Gabriel has said that the song is about a relationship in which the woman is sophisticated, bright, cultured, and knows everything about anything while the man knows nothing about anything; however, he does know about the woman, and she does not know much about herself.

"Steam" reached number 10 on the UK Singles Chart, number 32 on the US Billboard Hot 100, and number one on the US Modern Rock Tracks chart. In Canada the single became a number-one hit, topping the RPM Top Singles chart on the week of 27 February 1993, knocking Whitney Houston's hit "I Will Always Love You" off the top spot after a 10-week run. "Steam" also charted within the top 10 in Iceland, Ireland, New Zealand and Portugal.

An alternative version of this song called "Quiet Steam" was a B-side on the "Digging in the Dirt" single. It is a very lo-fi take on the popular version that appeared on the album. On Secret World Live, "Steam" is preceded for a minute or so by the "Quiet Steam" version.

Critical reception
In his weekly UK chart commentary, James Masterton stated, that the correspondingly ingenious video for "Steam" "will propel this into the Top 10." Alec Foege from Spin felt that the song, "with its pressure-cooked chorus (Give me steam / And how you feel can make you real) and greasy organ riff, practically parodies Prince's 'Cream'." Mike Joyce from The Washington Post viewed it as "such sure-fire Top 40 ammo" and "a likable (if shamelessly obvious) sequel" to Gabriel's 1986 hit 'Sledgehammer'.

Music video
The surreal video for "Steam" was directed by Stephen R. Johnson, who also directed the videos for Gabriel's earlier hits "Sledgehammer" and "Big Time". The director said he wanted to cram the video with as many "things" as possible. The video features digital imagery and numerous instances of sexual symbolism. This video was later shown on the 1994 video, Computer Animation Festival Vol. 2.0.

Awards and nominations

|-
| rowspan="3" | 1993
| rowspan="3" | MTV Video Music Award
| Best Male Video
| 
|-
| Best Visual Effects
| 
|-
| Best Editing
| 
|-
| rowspan="2" | 1994
| rowspan="2" | Grammy Award
| Best Solo Rock Vocal Performance
| 
|-
| Best Music Video
| 
|}

Track listing
All songs written by Peter Gabriel.
 "Steam" (LP version) – 6:02
 "Games Without Frontiers" (Massive / DB mix) – 5:19
 "Steam" (Oh, Oh, Let Off Steam mix 12") – 6:44
 "Steam" (Oh, Oh, Let Off Steam mix dub) – 5:44

Personnel
Producers
 Peter Gabriel
 Daniel Lanois
 Massive Attack / David Bottrill (remix and extra production on "Games without Frontiers")
 Hank Shocklee and The Bomb Squad (remix on "Oh, Oh, Let Off Steam" versions)

Musicians
 Peter Gabriel: vocals, keyboards, percussion, horn arrangement
 Manu Katché: electronic drums
 Tony Levin: bass guitar
 David Rhodes: guitar
 Daniel Lanois: horn arrangement
 David Bottrill: programming
 Richard Blair: programming
 The Babacar Faye Drummers: Sabar drums
 Leon Nocentelli: guitar (Epiphone)
 Tim Green: tenor saxophone
 Reggie Houston: baritone saxophone
 Wayne Jackson: trumpet
 Renard Poche: trombone

Charts

Weekly charts

Year-end charts

See also
Number-one Billboard modern rock hits of 1992
List of RPM number-one singles of 1993

References

1992 songs
1993 singles
Animated music videos
Funk rock songs
Geffen Records singles
Grammy Award for Best Short Form Music Video
Music videos directed by Stephen R. Johnson
Peter Gabriel songs
RPM Top Singles number-one singles
Song recordings produced by Daniel Lanois
Songs written by Peter Gabriel